The ST turn is a structural feature in proteins and polypeptides. Each consists of three amino acid residues (labeled i, i + 1 and i + 2) in which residue i is a serine (S) or threonine (T) that forms a hydrogen bond from its sidechain oxygen group to the mainchain NH group of residue i + 2.

Similar motifs occur with aspartate or asparagine as residue i, called asx turn. Four types of asx turn and ST turn can be distinguished: types I, I’, II and II’. These categories correspond (via sidechain-mainchain mimicry of residue i) to those of the more abundant hydrogen-bonded beta turns, which have four residues and a hydrogen bond between the CO of residue i and the NH of residue i + 3. Regarding their occurrence in proteins, they differ in that type I is the commonest of the four beta turns while type II’ is the commonest of the ST and asx turns.

Asx and ST turns both occur frequently at the N-termini of α-helices, as part of asx motifs or ST motifs, with the asx, serine or threonine as the N cap residue. They are thus often regarded as helix capping features.

Evidence for a functionally relevant ST turn is provided in the CDR3 region of the T-cell receptor (B chain, V domain) 

A proportion of ST turns are accompanied by a mainchain-mainchain hydrogen bond that qualifies them as ST motifs.

References

External links
Motivated Proteins
PDBeMotif

Protein structural motifs